The William H. McCreery House, also known as The McCreery House, operates as a wedding and event venue in Loveland, Colorado. It was built by William H. McCreery in 1900 and is an historic hexagonal house located at 746 North Washington Avenue in Loveland, Colorado.

In 2001 it was added to the National Register of Historic Places.

Its original portion was built in 1892.

See also
National Register of Historic Places listings in Larimer County, Colorado

References

External links
McCreeryhouse.com

Houses completed in 1900
Houses on the National Register of Historic Places in Colorado
Houses in Larimer County, Colorado
Octagon houses in the United States
National Register of Historic Places in Larimer County, Colorado